Sergei Babenko or Sergey Babenko may refer to:
 Sergei Babenko (basketball) (born 1961), Russian-Estonian basketballer
  (1912–2008), Ukrainian scientist